Beaucarnea recurvata, the elephant's foot or ponytail palm, is a species of plant in the family Asparagaceae. The species was native to numerous states of eastern Mexico but is now confined to the state of Veracruz. Despite its common name, it is not closely related to the true palms (Arecaceae). It has become popular in Europe and worldwide as an ornamental plant. There are 350-year-old Beaucarneas registered in Mexico.

Description

The single palm-like stem produces terminal tufts of strap-shaped, recurved leathery leaves, sometimes hair lock-shaped in the ends, and with occasional panicles of small white flowers once the plant reaches over 10 years of age.

The only moderately swollen trunk at the base is slender over it and only slightly branched. The almost spherical caudex in the youth stage later becomes 4 to 6 meters long and reaches a diameter of up to 50 centimeters and more at the base. The bark is smooth. The green lineal, slightly rejuvenated and bent leaves are thin, flat or slightly ridged. They are 90 to 180 inches long and 15 to 20 millimeters wide.

Habitat
Its habitat is low deciduous forest, with average temperatures of 20 °C and an annual rainfall of 800 mm, and a well-marked dry season of between 7 and 8 months. These types of forests are in an altitudinal range of 0 to 1700 meters above sea level. They grow on rocky soils deficient in nutrients, cliffs and steep mountains. The plant is resistant up to 10 °C, and grows in full sun or partial shade. The plants are very slow growing and very tolerant to drought, in a pot or planted as an ornamental garden tree.

Cultivation 
Having gained the Royal Horticultural Society's Award of Garden Merit. B. recurvata is often grown as a houseplant or an outdoor plant in temperate climate gardens. However, be cautious not to over-water, as this will foster pests like the mealybug and cochineal insect. If going to be kept in places with strong winters, it must be an indoor plant as it cannot resist cold temperatures. To maintain its original shape, the ends of its leaves should not be snipped, and when repotted it must keep all of its roots.

Conservation 
 
The species of the genus Beaucarnea are mostly in critical condition due to various anthropogenic activities, which has led to severe fragmentation and destruction of their habitat. Additionally, the collection of seeds, seedlings, juveniles and adults for commercial use has affected population size and the proportion of sexes, thereby reducing fertilization possibilities and, consequently, seed production.
This exploitation process exposes this species, in a state of threat or extinction, by reducing the minimum viable size of the populations, as well as the deterioration of their genetic diversity. Beaucarnea recurvata, is considered to be threatened according to Official Mexican Standard 059-ECOL-2010 of SEMARNAT in Mexico.

The species is listed in Appendix II  of the Convention on International Trade in Endangered Species (CITES) meaning international trade in the species and it's parts/derivatives is regulated by the CITES permitting system.

Gallery

References

External links

recurvata
Flora of Veracruz
Garden plants of North America
Ornamental trees
Drought-tolerant plants
Caudiciform plants
Taxa named by Charles Antoine Lemaire